Büyükkeşlik is a village in the Alaca District of Çorum Province in Turkey. Its population is 27 (2022). The village is populated by Kurds.

References

Villages in Alaca District
Kurdish settlements in Çorum Province